Bernard Parden (13 April 1907 – date of death unknown) was an English professional footballer who played as a forward. He made appearances in the English football league for Wrexham in the 1930s.

He also played for Worksop Town, Rhyl Athletic and Denaby United.

References

1907 births
Date of death unknown
English footballers
Association football forwards
English Football League players
Worksop Town F.C. players
Wrexham A.F.C. players
Rhyl F.C. players
Denaby United F.C. players